Kamenka is a rural locality (a settlement) in Kazantsevsky Selsoviet, Kuryinsky District, Altai Krai, Russia. The population was 58 as of 2013. There are 6 streets.

Geography 
Kamenka is located 39 km south of Kurya (the district's administrative centre) by road. Kazantsevo is the nearest rural locality.

References 

Rural localities in Kuryinsky District